A direct-administrated municipality, commonly known as municipality, is the highest level of classification for cities used by the People's Republic of China. These cities have the same rank as provinces and form part of the first tier of administrative divisions of China.

A municipality is a "city" with "provincial" power under a unified jurisdiction. As such, it is simultaneously a city and a province in its own right.

A municipality is often not a "city" in the usual sense of the term (i.e. a large continuous urban settlement), but instead an administrative unit comprising, typically, a main central urban area (a city in the usual sense, usually with the same name as the municipality) and its much larger surrounding rural area containing many smaller cities (districts and subdistricts), towns and villages. To distinguish a "municipality" from its actual urban area (the traditional meaning of the word city), the term "urban area" is used.

History 
The first municipalities were the 11 cities of Nanjing, Shanghai, Beijing, Tianjin, Qingdao, Chongqing, Xi'an, Guangzhou, Hankou (now part of Wuhan), Shenyang, and Harbin under the Republic of China. They were established in 1927 soon after they were designated as "cities" during the 1920s. Nominally, Dalian was a municipality as well, although it was under Japanese control. These cities were first called special municipalities/cities, but were later renamed Yuan-controlled municipalities, then direct-controlled municipalities by the Central Government.

After the establishment of the People's Republic of China in 1949, Anshan, Benxi, and Fushun were also made municipalities, while Qingdao, Dalian, and Harbin were reduced to provincial municipalities. Hankou was merged into Wuhan, which became a municipality of its own. Hence, there remained 12 municipalities. In November 1952, Nanjing was reduced to a provincial municipality. In March 1953, Lüda, which had resulted from the merger of Dalian and Lüshun in December 1950, was made a municipality. In July 1953, Harbin was restored to municipality status, whereas Changchun acquired that status for the first time. Except Beijing and Tianjin, which were under central control, all other municipalities were governed by the greater administrative areas.

In June 1954, 11 of the 14 municipalities were reduced to sub-provincial cities; many of them became capitals of the provinces they were in. Only Beijing, Shanghai, and Tianjin remained municipalities, until Chongqing was restored as a municipality in 1997 with a much enlarged area. Tianjin was also temporarily reverted to sub-provincial city status between 1958 and 1967.

Position in hierarchy 
Municipalities are the highest-ranked cities in the PRC. Some cities of lower levels may also refer to themselves as municipalities in the English language.

Three levels of cities in the People's Republic of China:

 Municipalities;
 Prefecture-level cities, including sub-provincial cities; and,
 County-level cities, including sub-prefecture-level cities.

Administration 
In municipalities, the highest ranking government official is the Mayor. The mayor is also a delegate in the National People's Congress (the legislature) and Deputy Secretary of the CPC Municipal Committee. However, the highest administrative authority in the municipality belongs to the Secretary of the CPC Municipal Committee or Party Secretary.

Current PRC municipalities

Government

Former ROC and PRC municipalities

See also 
 Independent city
 Federal city
 Federal cities of Russia — similar systems 
 Imperial immediacy

References

External links 
 

 
Direct-controlled municipalities
Territorial disputes of the Republic of China